Jerry Maynard Anderson (September 16, 1933 – June 14, 2008) was the 9th President of Ball State University and a speech and dramatics professor. He assumed the position on July 1, 1979, and served until his resignation in February 1981. Anderson was previously Vice Chancellor and Chief Academic Officer at the University of Wisconsin–Oshkosh. He later served as vice president of development of Concordia College, Moorhead. where he also taught for many years and even wrote a book with then president Paul Dovre titled Readings in argumentation.

Born in Amery, Wisconsin, Anderson is an alumnus of University of Wisconsin–River Falls, Michigan State University and Northern Illinois University. He holds a M.Sc. and Ph.D. in speech. He also taught at the University of Maine, Michigan State University, Central Michigan University and Washington State University. He was married to Betty Lou Schultz and has two sons. Anderson died at his home in Amery in 2008.

References

1933 births
2008 deaths
People from Amery, Wisconsin
Michigan State University alumni
Northern Illinois University alumni
University of Wisconsin–River Falls alumni
Presidents of Ball State University
University of Wisconsin–Oshkosh faculty
University of Maine faculty
Michigan State University faculty
Central Michigan University faculty
University of Washington faculty
Concordia College (Moorhead, Minnesota)
20th-century American academics